Georgia Valerie Toffolo (born 23 October 1994), also known as Toff, is a British media and television personality. She is best known for appearing on E4 reality television series Made in Chelsea from 2014 and winning the seventeenth series of ITV's I'm a Celebrity...Get Me Out of Here! in 2017. She also released her first book Always Smiling on 6 September 2018.

Personal life
Toffolo was born on 23 October 1994 in Torquay, Devon to scrap-metal dealer Gary Bennett and Nicola Toffolo. Raised in Devon and London, she attended Stoodley Knowle Independent School for Girls, Torquay Girls' Grammar School, The Maynard School, and Blundell's School. She has revealed that she was bullied at school and, after telling her father, was moved to Blundell's as a boarder. She then started an LLB degree in law and politics at the University of Westminster, with an ambition to work in commercial law, but dropped out (although several newspapers have reported that she managed to complete a law degree). She then worked in a charity shop, an old people's home, a family-run firm of solicitors in Devon, and London law firm Family Law in Partnership.

Toffolo has been a member of the Conservative Party since she was in secondary school. Toffolo has stated with regard to her political views, "I believe that the traditions of our country should be upheld and I'm a real advocate of business. I can't comprehend why someone my age would support the Labour Party."

Career
From its seventh series in 2014, Toffolo has appeared on reality television show Made in Chelsea. In September 2017 she appeared in the third series of Celebs Go Dating.

In November 2017, Toffolo was announced to be a contestant on the seventeenth series of ITV's I'm a Celebrity...Get Me Out of Here!. On 10 December, she won the series, beating Jamie Lomas and Iain Lee in the final. On 20 December, she announced she was joining This Morning.

In October 2019, she appeared in Celebrity Hunted – Stand Up to Cancer, partnering with Stanley Johnson (Boris Johnson’s father).
Toffolo and her spaniel dog, Monty, appeared in 2020 on Channel 4's Celebrity Snoop Dogs (series one, episode two) which also gave an insight into her home near central London.

In 2018 Toffolo published her autobiography/memoir, titled Always Smiling. In 2020, Toffolo revealed that she was writing a four-part series for the British romance publisher Mills & Boon. Her first novel, Meet Me in London, was published on 15 October 2020. Her second novel, Meet Me in Hawaii, was released on 18 April 2021.
Her third novel, entitled Meet Me in Tahiti, was released on 2 September 2021. The final novel of the series, Meet Me at the Wedding, was published on 28 April 2022. 

In 2022, ITV2 aired In Search of Perfect Skin. Produced by ITN Productions, the 60-minute film saw Toffolo, "who has previously taken a well-known but controversial prescription acne medication called Roaccutane," look into how the drug may affect some users.

Filmography

References

External links
 

1994 births
Living people
Alumni of the University of Westminster
Conservative Party (UK) people
I'm a Celebrity...Get Me Out of Here! (British TV series) winners
People educated at Torquay Grammar School for Girls
Mass media people from Torquay
Television personalities from Devon
Television personalities from London
Made in Chelsea